Bob Beckus (June 1, 1920 – October 21, 2003) was an American athlete. He competed in the men's triple jump at the 1948 Summer Olympics.

References

1920 births
2003 deaths
Athletes (track and field) at the 1948 Summer Olympics
American male triple jumpers
Olympic track and field athletes of the United States
Place of birth missing
20th-century American people